The Voorhees Chapel on the University of Jamestown campus in Jamestown, North Dakota was built in 1917.  It was designed by architect Barend H. Kroeze in Collegiate Gothic style.  It was listed on the National Register of Historic Places in 1977.

It is retardataire in its design.

References

Buildings and structures in Jamestown, North Dakota
Churches completed in 1917
Churches on the National Register of Historic Places in North Dakota
Gothic Revival church buildings in North Dakota
National Register of Historic Places in Stutsman County, North Dakota
University and college chapels in the United States
University and college buildings on the National Register of Historic Places in North Dakota
Presbyterianism in North Dakota
University of Jamestown
1917 establishments in North Dakota